is a former Japanese football player.

Playing career
Christopher Tatsuki Kinjo played for J2 League club; Avispa Fukuoka from 2013 to 2014. In 2015, he moved to J3 League club; FC Ryukyu.

Personal life
Christopher Tatsuki Kinjo is the older brother of Justin Toshiki Kinjo currently play at SC Sagamihara. He is born in Japan, and is of American descent.

References

External links

1993 births
Living people
Association football people from Okinawa Prefecture
Japanese footballers
Japanese people of American descent
J2 League players
J3 League players
Avispa Fukuoka players
FC Ryukyu players
Association football midfielders